This is a partial list of expansion bus interfaces, or expansion card slots, for installation of expansion cards.

Bus interfaces

See also 

 List of interface bit rates

References 

Computer buses